Elise Kellond-Knight (born 10 August 1990) is an Australian international football player, who plays for Melbourne Victory in the A-League Women and the Australian national team. Kellond-Knight is a left footed set piece specialist.

Club career
At the annual Westfield W-League awards dinner in 2009, Kellond-Knight was jointly awarded the Young Player of the Year Award with Canberra United's Ellyse Perry.

After leaving 1. FFC Turbine Potsdam at the end of 2017, Kellond-Knight was hoping to join the Reign FC in the NWSL, however a discovery claim by the North Carolina Courage prevented her from joining the Reign. In April 2018, she signed a short-term deal with Hammarby in the Damallsvenskan. In June she extended her contract through the end of the season.

Kellond-Knight signed with Melbourne City for the 2018–19 W-League season.

Reign FC announced on September 24, 2018, that Kellond-Knight had signed with them for the 2019 NWSL season.

On July 15, 2019, Kellond-Knight was traded to Washington Spirit in exchange for Sammy Jo Prudhomme. On October 26, 2019, Kellond-Knight returned to Brisbane Roar.

In November 2022, Kellond-Knight returned to Australia, joining reigning champions Melbourne Victory.

International career
For her performances at the 2011 FIFA Women's World Cup and 2015 FIFA Women's World Cup, Kellond-Knight was named as part of the All Star Teams for both tournaments.

During a match against Brazil in the 2016 Olympics, a moment of Kellond-Knight and her teammate Lisa De Vanna went viral when during a short break, De Vanna absentmindedly tried to drink from the wrong end of a water bottle, prompting Kellond-Knight to quickly flip it in her hand.

On October 9, 2018, Kellond-Knight earned her 100th cap for Australia in a friendly against England, which ended in a 1–1 draw.

At the 2019 Women's World Cup, she scored a goal directly from a corner kick in the Round of 16 match against Norway.

Kellond-Knight was selected for the Australian women's football Matildas soccer team which qualified for the Tokyo 2020 Olympics. The Matildas advanced to the quarter-finals with one victory and a draw in the group play. In the quarter-finals they beat Great Britain 4-3 after extra time. However, they lost 1–0 to Sweden in the semi-final and were then beaten 4–3 in the bronze medal playoff by USA. Full details.

Career statistics

International goals

Honours

Club
 Brisbane Roar
 W-League Championship: 2008–09, 2010–11
 W-League Premiership: 2008–09

International
 Australia
 AFC Women's Asian Cup: 2010
 AFF Women's Championship: 2008
 AFC Olympic Qualifying Tournament: 2016
 Tournament of Nations: 2017
 FFA Cup of Nations: 2019

Individual
 W-League Young Player of the Year: 2009
 FIFA Women's World Cup All-Star Team: 2011, 2015
 FFA Female Footballer of the Year: 2011

See also
 List of women's footballers with 100 or more caps

References

External links
 
 
 
  (archive)
 
 
 

1990 births
Living people
Australian women's soccer players
Brisbane Roar FC (A-League Women) players
2011 FIFA Women's World Cup players
2015 FIFA Women's World Cup players
Footballers at the 2016 Summer Olympics
Australia women's international soccer players
A-League Women players
1. FFC Turbine Potsdam players
Fortuna Hjørring players
Iga FC Kunoichi players
Nadeshiko League players
Australian expatriate women's soccer players
Australian expatriate sportspeople in Germany
Australian expatriate sportspeople in Denmark
Australian expatriate sportspeople in Japan
Expatriate women's footballers in Germany
Expatriate women's footballers in Japan
Expatriate women's footballers in Denmark
Sportspeople from the Gold Coast, Queensland
Soccer players from Queensland
Women's association football midfielders
Olympic soccer players of Australia
FIFA Century Club
OL Reign players
Washington Spirit players
2019 FIFA Women's World Cup players
National Women's Soccer League players
Melbourne City FC (A-League Women) players
Frauen-Bundesliga players
Damallsvenskan players
Hammarby Fotboll (women) players
Melbourne Victory FC (A-League Women) players
Footballers at the 2020 Summer Olympics
Australian expatriate sportspeople in Sweden
Expatriate women's footballers in Sweden
Sportswomen from Queensland